The Royal Liverpool Golf Club is a golf club in Wirral in Merseyside, England. It was founded in 1869 on what was then the racecourse of the Liverpool Hunt Club. It received the "Royal" designation in 1871 due to the patronage of the Duke of Connaught of the day, one of Queen Victoria's younger sons, Robert Chambers and George Morris (younger brother of Old Tom Morris) were commissioned to lay out the original course, which was extended to 18 holes in 1871. Harry Colt, one of the world's leading golf course architects, redesigned the course early in the 20th century, and it has since been tweaked periodically, mainly as a response to advances in equipment.

Location
Royal Liverpool Golf Club is located in the small town of Hoylake, at the northwest corner of the Wirral Peninsula. The golf course extends between Hoylake and the neighbouring town of West Kirby, to the southwest. It has a single 18-hole course, which is a seaside links.

History
Royal Liverpool was the inaugural men's amateur championship host in 1885, which became The Amateur Championship. It was host to the first ever international match between Scotland and England in 1902. It hosted the first Home International matches between Great Britain & Ireland and the United States in 1921, an event which became the Walker Cup. In fact, it is Royal Liverpool Golf Club's contribution to the amateur game that has set it apart from all other clubs in England. Although, at the end of the nineteenth century, it was the Royal and Ancient Golf Club of St Andrews that took on the role of the governing body in golf as the game developed, it was at Royal Liverpool that the rules of amateur status were laid down. The Open at Royal Liverpool was also the scene of the second leg of Bobby Jones' historic Grand Slam in 1930.

Superstar champions Ball and Hilton
The history of Royal Liverpool would not be complete without mention of two of the club's most famous sons, Harold Hilton and John Ball. Between them they dominated the amateur game of their era, and the pair were also a major influence on the professional game, each of them winning the Open Championship as amateurs. Ball won the Amateur Championship eight times between 1888 and 1912, and was runner-up twice. The venerable Ball competed in the Amateur Championship as late as 1921 when Royal Liverpool hosted the event. He won the Open Championship in 1890, the first Englishman and the first amateur to do so, and also took the Amateur title the same year.

Harold Hilton's record was just as impressive. He won the Open twice, in 1892 (the first year the Open was played over 72 holes) and again five years later, making him the only amateur apart from John Ball and Bobby Jones to win the title. His victory at Hoylake in 1897 was marked 100 years later by the creation of a new, annual Harold Hilton Medal tournament open to amateur golfers aged 30 or more and handicap five or less. Hilton also won the Amateur Championship four times, was runner-up on three occasions, and won the U.S. Amateur Championship in 1911, the year in which he also held the British title. This feat made him the first to hold both major amateur titles simultaneously. In the same year he still found time to become the first editor of the new Golf Monthly magazine.

Character of the course
Many comments have been made over the years about the quality and toughness of the links. The wind was conspicuous by its absence during the benign Open week in 2006. However, such was winner Tiger Woods' respect for the need for strategic play that he only hit his driver once during the tournament, with the course baked out due to dry conditions, and playing very fast. The course is mostly level, but the holes nearest the coast run through sandhills. The course underwent a variety of changes in advance of the 2023 Open Championship. The work included a new par-3 that will play as the 17th hole during The Open.

Important events
Important tournaments staged at Royal Liverpool include:

The Open Championship: 1897, 1902, 1907, 1913, 1924, 1930, 1936, 1947, 1956, 1967, 2006, 2014
The Amateur Championship: 1885 (the inaugural event), 1887, 1890, 1894, 1898, 1902, 1906, 1910, 1921, 1927, 1933, 1939, 1953, 1962, 1969, 1975, 1995, 2000
Ladies' British Amateur Championship: 1896, 1989, 1996
Women's British Open: 2012
Walker Cup: 1983, 2019
Curtis Cup: 1992

The course has also hosted a number of professional tournaments on the European Tour and before its foundation in 1972. Royal Liverpool has been the site for many tournaments for ladies, seniors, and boys, and various regional and representative events. It hosted The Open Championship for the first time in 39 years in 2006; Tiger Woods won his third Open Championship, two strokes ahead of runner-up Chris DiMarco. It was an emotional victory for Woods, who had lost his father to prostate cancer just two months earlier.

Royal Liverpool hosted the 2010 English Men's Open Amateur Stroke Play Championship for the Brabazon Trophy; the event was won by Darren Wright. The links had earlier staged the Brabazon on four occasions. In 1961, Ronnie Shade was champion, followed in 1972 by Peter Moody, a former University of Cambridge captain. Sandy Lyle lifted the trophy in 1977, while the 1989 event saw a tie between Craig Rivett from South Africa and Neil Roderick from Wales.

Royal Liverpool hosted the Women's British Open for the first time in 2012. The championship was won by South Korea's Jiyai Shin, who set a new record for the largest winning margin in the event (9 strokes) and a new women's course record of 64 in her second round.

The Open Championship
The twelve winners of The Open Championship at Royal Liverpool Golf Club:

Note: For multiple winners of The Open Championship, superscript ordinal identifies which in their respective careers.
(a) denotes amateur

Scorecard

At the 2006 Open Championship and 2014 Open Championship, play started at the 17th hole (Royal) and concluded at the par-5 16th hole (Dun).

See also
List of golf clubs granted Royal status

References

External links

Golf clubs and courses in Merseyside
Golf clubs and courses designed by Harry Colt
The Open Championship venues
Walker Cup venues
Curtis Cup venues
Sport in the Metropolitan Borough of Wirral
Organisations based in the United Kingdom with royal patronage
1869 establishments in England
Sports venues completed in 1869
Royal golf clubs